The Geneva United States Post Office is a historic building in Geneva, Nebraska. It was built in 1939–1940, and designed in the Georgian Revival style by architect Louis A. Simon. Inside, there is a mural by Edward Chávez, completed in 1941.  The mural was cleaned and restored in 1981 and was then in excellent condition.

The building was listed on the National Register of Historic Places in 1992 as U.S. Post Office-Geneva.

References

	
National Register of Historic Places in Fillmore County, Nebraska
Post office buildings on the National Register of Historic Places in Nebraska
Georgian Revival architecture in Nebraska
Government buildings completed in 1940
1940 establishments in Nebraska